André François (13 January 1886 – 17 March 1915) was a French footballer. He competed in the men's tournament at the 1908 Summer Olympics.

References

External links
 
 
 

1886 births
1915 deaths
French footballers
France international footballers
Olympic footballers of France
Footballers at the 1908 Summer Olympics
French military personnel killed in World War I
Sportspeople from Roubaix
Association football forwards
RC Roubaix players
Footballers from Hauts-de-France